Grua or La Grua, used as a surname, may refer to: 
 
 Carlo Grua (1700–1773), Italian composer
 Emmy La Grua (1831–1869), Italian opera singer
 Kenton Grua (1950–2002), American explorer
 Matteo La Grua (1914–2012), Italian Roman Catholic priest and exorcist of the Franciscan Order
 Shawn Ellen LaGrua (1962), American judge